Overseas Countries and Territories Association (OCTA; , PTOM) is an international organisation founded on 17 November 2000 during the conference of prime ministers of overseas countries and territories in Brussels, Belgium. It includes almost all special member state territories of European Union whose purpose is to improve economic development in overseas countries and territories and cooperation with the European Union. It currently has 13 members. On 25 June 2008, a Cooperation Treaty between the EU and OCTA was signed in Brussels.

Prior to Brexit, until 31 January 2020, there had been 22 Overseas Countries and Territories associated with the European Union and members of OCTA.

Chairmen 

Since 2011, the chairmen are chosen annually and their function is to head the organization and elect an Executive Committee. The current and previous chairmen are:
 Reuben Meade, Premier of Montserrat (1 January – 31 December 2011)
 Kuupik Kleist, Prime Minister of Greenland (1 January – 31 December 2012)
 Stéphane Artano, President of the Territorial Council of Saint Pierre and Miquelon (1 January – 31 December 2013)
 Orlando Smith, Premier of British Virgin Islands (1 January 2014 – 26 February 2015)
 Ivar Asjes, Prime Minister of Curaçao (26 February 2015 – 31 August 2015)
 Bernard Whiteman, Prime Minister of Curaçao (31 August 2015 – 25 February 2016)
 Michiel Godfried Eman, Prime Minister of Aruba (25 February 2016 – 23 February 2017)
 Sharlene Cartwright Robinson, Premier of the Turks and Caicos Islands (23 February 2017 – 22 February 2018)
 Édouard Fritch, President of French Polynesia (22 February 2018 – 27 February 2019)
 Eugene Rhuggenaath, Prime Minister of Curaçao (27 February 2019 – 8 December 2020)
 Thierry Santa, President of New Caledonia (8 December 2020 – 22 July 2021)
 Louis Mapou, President of New Caledonia (since 22 July 2021)

OCTA members 
The members of OCTA are:

Former members

Political dialogue between EU, OCTA, and EU member states 
The forum between OCTs, European Union and its member states to which OCTs are linked, has been held annually since 2003 alternating between Brussels (Belgium) and an OCT:
 September 2002 – Brussels (Belgium)
 December 2003 – Brussels (Belgium)
 March 2005 – Papeete (French Polynesia)
 December 2005 – Brussels (Belgium)
 September 2006 – Nuuk (Greenland)
 November 2007 – Brussels (Belgium)
 November 2008 – George Town (Cayman Islands)
 March 2010 – Brussels (Belgium)
 March 2011 – Nouméa (New Caledonia)
 January 2012 – Brussels (Belgium)
 September 2012 – Ilulissat (Greenland)
 December 2013 – Brussels (Belgium)
 February 2015 – Road Town (British Virgin Islands)
 February 2016 – Brussels (Belgium)
 February 2017 – Oranjestad (Aruba)
 February 2018 – Brussels (Belgium)
 February 2019 – Tahiti (French Polynesia)
 December 2020 – online

See also 

 European Union
 Special member state territories and the European Union

References

External links 
 Official website
 Founding document (27 November 2001)

International organisations based in Belgium
Organizations established in 2000
Organizations related to the European Union
Organisations based in Brussels